Lanjar is a Sindhi tribe settled in Sindh for over seven centuries, occupying a small part of Sindh. The majority of Lanjars is found in Sukkur taluka Pano Aqil, Nawabshah, Ranipur, village Manjhu, Deh Khahi Qasim, Naushahro Feroze, Sindh Near Tehsil, Bhiria City, Naushahro Froze District , Lakho Lanjari Ghotki, Lanjari Sharif, Shikarpur, and in various locations of Sindh.

History

A famous saint of Manjhu called Makhdoom Sahirr Siwai (also known as Muhammad Saleh Lanjar) is buried in the cemetery of Manjhu village and his tomb is located there. Makhdoom Sahir Lanjar departed in the 15th century when Pathans attacked Sindh in the time when Samma Dynasty falls.

References

Sindhi tribes